The Mitsubishi Town Box is a kei car (Town Box) and minivan (Town Box Wide) produced for the Japanese domestic market (JDM) by the Japanese automaker Mitsubishi Motors. It was initially available with the alloy-headed 4A30 657 cc inline-four engine, but switched to the 3G83 659 cc straight-three engine in 2002. In August 2001, a slightly larger version of the same vehicle powered by a 4A31 1.1 L straight-four, the Mitsubishi Town Box Wide, was discontinued. The first generation Town Box was discontinued in November 2011, ending the twelve-year production run. The model returned in February 2014 as a rebadged version of the Suzuki Every Wagon. 

The first generation Town Box was also sold in Japan as the Nissan Clipper Rio, while the Town Box Wide was also produced under licence in Malaysia as the Proton Juara.

Suzuki OEM deal
In February 2014, Mitsubishi started selling rebadged Suzuki Carry trucks and Every vans as the Mitsubishi Minicab. The passenger-oriented Every Wagon, which has a more designed rear end but shares the Carry Van's chassis code, was also included and received the Town Box badge (DS64W). As the Every only had a year of production left, Mitsubishi did not spend a lot of effort to distinguish their model, restraining themselves to changing the badges. In March 2015 a new Every Wagon and Town Box was introduced (DS17W). The newest model offers increased interior space, a longer wheelbase, and the new Suzuki R06A engine; turbocharged and intercooled. It is offered in G and G Special specs.

Annual production and sales

(Sources: Facts & Figures 2000, Facts & Figures 2005, Facts & Figures 2009, Mitsubishi Motors website)

Gallery

References

External links

 Mitsubishi Town Box, Mitsubishi-motors.com
 

Town Box
Cars introduced in 1999
2000s cars
2010s cars
2020s cars
Microvans
Rear-wheel-drive vehicles
All-wheel-drive vehicles
OEM Suzuki vehicles